Tianshannet is the sole official news website of Xinjiang, China. The website was established by the government of Xinjiang Uygur Autonomous Region and the People's Daily Online on December 18, 2001. Tianshannet includes Mandarin Chinese, Russian, Uyghur, English and Kazakh language versions.

In July 2006, the English version of Tianshannet was started.

In August 2007, BBC Learning English announced a partnership with Tianshannet.

In July 2009, the Kazakh version of Tianshannet was started.

See also
 Xinjiang Daily
 Xinjiang People's Broadcasting Station

References

Mass media in Xinjiang
Internet properties established in 2001
2001 establishments in China
Multilingual news services

External links 

 

Government-owned companies of China
Chinese Communist Party newspapers
State media